is a 2010 Japanese film based on the novel of the same name by Shinobu Gotoh. It is directed by Kenji Yokoi and stars Kyousuke Hamao and Daisuke Watanabe.

Plot

This is the beginning of third-year school and Takumi Hayama (Kyousuke Hamao) is looking forward to see Giichi "Gui" Saki (Daisuke Watanabe) after the school break. Takumi will no longer be Gui's roommate, and Gui, who is now the third floor's dorm head, has his own room. He soon discovers that since Gui's return from New York, not only has his appearance changed but also his attitude towards him and the others. Besides being cold and avoiding him on purpose, Gui even suggests they stop seeing each other for a while. Deeply affected by the sudden change in Gui's attitude and rejection, Takumi's human contact phobia relapses. Takumi's roommate Arata Misu (Ryōma Baba), who dislikes Gui, informs Gui of Takumi's relapse and his intention to cure Takumi of his phobia if they were to break up.

Cast
Kyousuke Hamao as Takumi Hayama
Daisuke Watanabe as Giichi "Gui" Saki
Yukihiro Takiguchi as Shōzō Aikaike
Ryōma Baba as Arata Misu
Bishin Kawasumi as Kanemitsu Shingyouji
Mio Akaba as Toshihisa Katakura
Yasuka Saitō as Masataka Nozawa

References

External links
Official web site

2010 films
Boys' love films
Films based on Japanese novels
Films set in Japan
2010s Japanese-language films
Gay-related films
Japanese LGBT-related films
2010 LGBT-related films
2010 romantic drama films
LGBT-related romantic drama films
2010s Japanese films